Earl of Wilton, of Wilton Castle in the County of Herefordshire, is a title in the Peerage of the United Kingdom. It was created in 1801 for Thomas Egerton, 1st Baron Grey de Wilton, along with the subsidiary title of Viscount Grey de Wilton, also in the Peerage of the United Kingdom. Both titles were created with remainder to the second and all younger sons successively of his daughter Eleanor, wife of Robert Grosvenor, 1st Marquess of Westminster.

History

The 1st Earl of Wilton was a member of the Egerton family and the eldest son of Sir Thomas Grey Egerton, 6th Baronet of Egerton and Oulton. He had earlier resided at Heaton Hall near Manchester and represented Lancashire in Parliament.

He was a descendant of Sir Roland Egerton, 1st Baronet, who had married Bridget Grey, sister and co-heir of Thomas Grey, 15th Baron Grey de Wilton, who was attainted in 1603 and forfeited his title. In 1756, Thomas Egerton succeeded his father as 7th Baronet and in 1784 was created Baron Grey de Wilton, of Wilton Castle in the County Hereford, in the Peerage of Great Britain, with remainder to the heirs male of his body.

When the 1st Earl of Wilton died in 1814, the Grey de Wilton barony became extinct as he had no male heirs, while the Grey Egerton baronetcy passed to his kinsman John Grey Egerton, who became the 8th Baronet. The titles of Earl of Wilton and Viscount Grey de Wilton passed, according to the special remainder, to the 1st Earl's grandson Thomas Grosvenor, who adopted the surname of Egerton and became the 2nd Earl. He was the second son of Lady Eleanor Egerton (and her husband, the 1st Marquess of Westminster), the younger brother of Richard Grosvenor, 2nd Marquess of Westminster, and the elder brother of Lord Robert Grosvenor, who was created Baron Ebury in 1857. The 2nd Earl notably served as Lord Steward of the Household in 1835, in the Tory administration of Sir Robert Peel.

His eldest son, who became the 3rd Earl of Wilton, had represented Weymouth and Bath in Parliament as a Conservative. In 1875, seven years before the 3rd Earl had succeeded his father, he was raised to the peerage as Baron Grey de Radcliffe, in the County Palatine of Lancaster. However, the 3rd Earl was childless, and on his death in 1885, this barony became extinct. He was succeeded in his other titles by his younger brother, who became the 4th Earl of Wilton.

On the death in 1999 of his great-grandson, the 7th Earl of Wilton, the line of the 2nd Earl failed. He was succeeded according to the special remainder by his kinsman Francis Egerton Grosvenor, 6th Baron Ebury (a great-great-grandson of Robert Grosvenor, 1st Baron Ebury, younger brother of the second Earl), who became the 8th Earl of Wilton.

Earls of Wilton (1801)
Thomas Egerton, 1st Earl of Wilton (1749–1814)
Thomas Egerton, 2nd Earl of Wilton (1799–1882)
Arthur Edward Holland Grey Egerton, 3rd Earl of Wilton (1833–1885)
Seymour John Grey Egerton, 4th Earl of Wilton (1839–1898)
Arthur George Egerton, 5th Earl of Wilton (1863–1915)
Seymour Edward Frederick Egerton, 6th Earl of Wilton (1896–1927)
Seymour William Arthur John Egerton, 7th Earl of Wilton (1921–1999), succeeded to the earldom at the age of 6. Having no children, he was succeeded by his kinsman, Francis Egerton Grosvenor.
Francis Egerton Grosvenor, 8th Earl of Wilton (b. 1934), son of Robert Egerton Grosvenor, 5th Baron Ebury.

The heir apparent is the present holder's only son, Julian Francis Martin Grosvenor, Viscount Grey de Wilton (b. 1959).

Family tree

Line of succession

 Thomas Egerton, 1st Earl of Wilton (1749–1814)
Lady Eleanor Egerton (1770–1846)
 Richard Grosvenor, 2nd Marquess of Westminster (1795–1869)
 Hugh Grosvenor, 1st Duke of Westminster (1825–1899)Dukes of Westminster
 Robert Grosvenor, 1st Baron Ebury (1801–1883)  Robert Wellesley Grosvenor, 2nd Baron Ebury (1834 - 1918)  Robert Victor Grosvenor, 3rd Baron Ebury (1868 - 1921)  Francis Egerton Grosvenor, 4th Baron Ebury (1883 - 1932)  Robert Egerton Grosvenor, 5th Baron Ebury (1914 - 1957)  The Right Honourable Francis Egerton Grosvenor, 8th Earl of Wilton (born 1934)
 (1) Julian Francis Martin Grosvenor, Viscount Grey de Wilton (b. 1959)
 The Hon. William Wellesley Grosvenor (1942 - 2002) (2) Alexander Egerton Grosvenor (b. 1968)
 (3) The Hon. Richard Alexander Grosvenor (b. 1946)
 (4) Bendor Robert Gerard Grosvenor (b. 1977)
 The Hon. Hugh Richard Grosvenor (1919 - 2002)''
 (5) William Peter Wellesley Grosvenor (b. 1959)

See also
Baron Ebury
Duke of Westminster
Baron Stalbridge

References

Debrett's Baronetage of England

External links

Earldoms in the Peerage of the United Kingdom
Noble titles created in 1801
Peerages created with special remainders